Events in the year 1864 in India.

Incumbents
Sir William Denison, acting Viceroy (till 12 January)
Sir John Lawrence, Viceroy

Events
 Shimla was declared as the summer capital of British India.
Dietrich brandis set up Indian forest service

Law
Indian Tolls Act
Naval Prize Act (British statute)
India Office Site Act (British statute)

 
India
Years of the 19th century in India